Solanki also known as Chaulukya is a clan name originally associated with the Rajputs in Northern India but which has also been borrowed by other communities such as the Saharias as a means of advancement by the process of sanskritisation. Other groups that use the name include the Bhils of Rajasthan, Koḷis, Ghān̄cīs, Kumbhārs, Bāroṭs, Kaḍiyās, Darjīs, Mocīs, Ḍheḍhs, and Bhangīs.

See also
Solanki dynasty

References
Citations

Bibliography

Rajput clans
Indian surnames